Fowler's toad (Anaxyrus fowleri) is a species of toad in the family Bufonidae. The species is native to North America, where it occurs in much of the eastern United States and parts of adjacent Canada. It was previously considered a subspecies of Woodhouse's toad (Anaxyrus woodhousii, formerly Bufo woodhousii).

Etymology
The specific name, fowleri, is in honor of naturalist Samuel Page Fowler (1800–1888) from Massachusetts, who was a founder of the Essex County Natural History Society, which later became the Essex Institute.

Description
Fowler's toad is usually brown, grey, olive green and rust red in color with darkened warty spots. If the toad has a pale stripe on its back, it is an adult. The belly is usually uniformly whitish except for one dark spot. The male may be darker in overall color than the female.

The adult toad is typically  in head-body length.

Range

Their native geographic range is eastern North America. Their range extends throughout most of the southeastern and eastern United States and parts of southeastern Canada. They reside in areas near temporary or permanent wetlands as well as forested areas.

Reproduction
Fowler's toad reproduces in warmer seasons of the year, especially in May and June. It breeds in open, shallow waters such as ponds, lakeshores, and marshes. The male produces a call which attracts not only females, but also other males. The calling male may attempt to mate with one of the other males, which will then produce a chirping "release call", informing him of his mistake. It has been found that male Fowler's toads mating calls are affected by the body size and temperature of the caller. Females are often able to discriminate between variations in these calls and select the largest available males. Males are able to alter their calls to make them seem more attractive to females through thermoregulation. When a male finds a female, the pair will initiate amplexus and up to 7,000 to 10,000 eggs are fertilized. They hatch in 2 to 7 days. Based on observations, Fowler's toads breed repeatedly through the spring.
 As many as 10 different age classes, separated by several days, have been observed over the course of a breeding season in one small pond. A new tadpole may reach sexual maturity in one season, but the process may take up to three years.

Fowler's toad regularly hybridizes with two of its close relatives: the American toad and the Woodhouse's toad. The Woodhouse's toad subspecies Anaxyrus woodhousii velatus, or the East Texas toad, is possibly a hybrid of the Woodhouse's toad and the Fowler's toad.

Behavior
Predators of Fowler's toad include snakes, birds, and small mammals. It uses defensive coloration to blend into its surroundings. It also secretes a noxious compound from the warts on its back. The secretion is distasteful to predators and can be lethal to small mammals. The toad is also known to play dead.

Habitat
Fowler's toad lives in open woodlands, sand prairies, meadows, and beaches. It burrows into the ground during hot, dry periods and during the winter.

Diet
The adult Fowler's toad eats insects and other small terrestrial invertebrates, but avoids earthworms, unlike its close relative, the American toad (Anaxyrus americanus). This toad also has been shown to eat velvet ants, which is an ant that gives a very painful sting to humans, but does nothing to the toad. The tadpole scrapes algae and bacterial mats from rocks and plants using the tooth-like structures in its mouth.

Conservation status
An important conservation measure for Fowler's toad is the protection of its breeding sites. Off-road vehicles commonly used in beach and dune habitats are damaging to this species. Agricultural chemicals have caused declines in some areas. It is considered a species at risk in Ontario, a species of special concern in the U.S. state of New Jersey, and a regionally threatened or endangered species in the states of New Hampshire and Vermont.

References

Further reading
Behler JL, King FW (1979). The Audubon Society Field Guide to North American Reptiles and Amphibians. New York: Alfred A. Knopf. 743 pp. . (Bufo woodhousei fowleri, pp. 398–399 + Plate 248).
Hinckley, Mary H. (1882). "On Some Differences in the Mouth Structure of Tadpoles of the Anourous Batrachians of Milton, Mass." Proc. Boston Soc. Nat. Hist. 21: 307-315 + Plate 5. (Bufo fowleri, new species). (in English and French).
Powell R, Conant R, Collins JT (2016). Peterson Field Guide to Reptiles and Amphibians of Eastern and Central North America, Fourth Edition. Boston and New York: Houghton Mifflin Harcourt. xiv + 494 pp. . (Anaxyrus fowleri, pp. 120–121 + Plate 8 + Figure 54 on p. 117).
Zim HS, Smith HM (1956). Reptiles and Amphibians: A Guide to Familiar American Species: A Golden Nature Guide. Revised edition. New York: Simon and Schuster. 160 pp. (Bufo woodhousei fowleri, pp. 122–123, 157).

External links

Vereecke M (2001). Anaxyrus fowleri (On-line), Animal Diversity Web. Accessed 7 May 2012.
Fowler's Toad. Royal Ontario Museum.

Anaxyrus
Amphibians described in 1882
Amphibians of Canada
Amphibians of the United States